Donald Laverne Secrist (born February 26, 1944) is an American former professional baseball player, a left-handed pitcher who appeared in 28 games played, all in relief, for the – Chicago White Sox of Major League Baseball.

Secrist had two outstanding seasons in minor league baseball. After signing with the Baltimore Orioles, he was undefeated in seven decisions with a 1.96 earned run average for the 1963 Aberdeen Pheasants of the Class A Northern League. Drafted from the Orioles by the Cincinnati Reds following that season, Secrist spent five more years in the Reds' farm system. In his last, in 1968, he won 11 games and lost two for the Indianapolis Indians of the Triple-A Pacific Coast League. Following that campaign, he was dealt with catcher Don Pavletich to the White Sox for pitcher Jack Fisher.

Secrist then spent much of the 1969 season with the MLB White Sox, appearing in 19 games, making his debut during the home opener of the expansion Seattle Pilots at Sick's Stadium in his native city. He recorded his only MLB decision, a loss, on July 16 against the Minnesota Twins. Secrist pitched four innings that day and allowed only two runs, but he gave up the game-winning tally on a home run by Minnesota's Rich Reese. In 1970, he appeared in nine more games for the ChiSox during April, May and June before returning to the minor leagues. In 28 games and 54⅔ innings pitched at a Major Leaguer, Secrist allowed 54 hits, nine home runs, and 26 bases on balls with 32 strikeouts.

References

External links
, or Retrosheet, or Pura Pelota

1944 births
Living people
Aberdeen Pheasants players
Águilas del Zulia players
Baseball players from Seattle
Bradley Braves baseball players
Buffalo Bisons (minor league) players
Chicago White Sox players
Florida Instructional League Reds players
Indianapolis Indians players
Knoxville Smokies players
Macon Peaches players
Major League Baseball pitchers
Peninsula Grays players
Tacoma Cubs players
Tigres de Aragua players
American expatriate baseball players in Venezuela
Tucson Toros players